Alan Phillips (28 October 192324 June 2009) was a chess master who won the British Chess Championship in 1954, along with Leonard Barden. He was one of the stars in the Stockport Grammar School chess club started by Richard K. Guy in 1939. After World War II, he studied at University of Cambridge, where he tied with Peter Swinnerton-Dyer for the university chess championship. He is the author of a number of articles and books on chess, including
Chess: Sixty years on with Caissa & Friends, Caissa Editions, 2003
The Chess Teacher, Oxford University Press, 1978

External links
 Times Obituary 
 Chess Games of Alan Phillips
 Spectator article

1923 births
2009 deaths
British chess players
20th-century chess players